The Men's  relay T11-13 for blind & visually impaired athletes at the 2004 Summer Paralympics were held in the Athens Olympic Stadium on 27 September. The event consisted of 3 heats and a final, and was won by the team representing .

1st round

Heat 1
27 Sept. 2004, 09:30

Heat 2
27 Sept. 2004, 09:40

Heat 3
27 Sept. 2004, 09:50

Final round

27 Sept. 2004, 22:00

Team Lists

References

M